The 2009 season of the Polish American Football League (PLFA I) was the 4th season played by the major american football league in Poland. Regular season play was held from April 5 to September 20, 2009. The Polish champion title was eventually won by the AZS Silesia Miners when they defeated The Crew Wrocław; the Polish Bowl championship game, at the Marymont stadium in Warsaw, Masovian Voivodeship on October 17.

Regular season

Playoffs 
Top four teams was qualify to the play-offs.

Bracket

Semi-finals 
 October 3, Wrocław
 The Crew vs. Kozły 28:8
 October 4, Katowice
 Miners vs. Eagles 31:26

Polish Bowl IV 
 October 17, 2009
 Warsaw
 Marymont stadium
 Attendance: 1,200
 MVP: Grzegorz Suder (Miners)

See also 
 2009 in sports

References

External links 
 Polish American Football Association

Polish American Football League seasons
Poland
Plfa Season, 2009